Conus regularis, common name the regular cone, is a species of sea snail, a marine gastropod mollusk in the family Conidae, the cone snails and their allies.

Like all species within the genus Conus, these marine snails are predatory and venomous. They are capable of "stinging" humans, therefore live ones should be handled carefully or not at all.

Description
The size of the shell varies between 25 mm and 86 mm. The color of the shell is white or yellowish white, with chestnut-chocolate maculations and spots, variously arranged in revolving series. Sometimes the ground color of the shell is chestnut, with dark chocolate markings and chocolate aperture. The spire is somewhat concavely elevated, with an acute apex. The epidermis is thin, smooth and translucent.

Distribution
This species occurs in the Pacific Ocean off Mexico.

Gallery

References

 Petit, R. E. (2009). George Brettingham Sowerby, I, II & III: their conchological publications and molluscan taxa. Zootaxa. 2189: 1–218
  Puillandre N., Duda T.F., Meyer C., Olivera B.M. & Bouchet P. (2015). One, four or 100 genera? A new classification of the cone snails. Journal of Molluscan Studies. 81: 1–23

External links
 The Conus Biodiversity website
 Cone Shells - Knights of the Sea
 

regularis
Gastropods described in 1833
Taxa named by George Brettingham Sowerby I